This is a list of Trinidad and Tobago writers, including writers either from or associated with Trinidad and Tobago.

A
 Claire Adam (born 1974)
 André Alexis (born 1957)
 Lisa Allen-Agostini 
 Lauren K. Alleyne (born 1979)
 Michael Anthony (born 1930)
 Robert Antoni (born 1958)
 William Archibald (1917–1970)
 Barbara Assoon (born 1929)

B
 Kevin Baldeosingh (born 1963)
 Valerie Belgrave (1946–2016)
 Gérard Besson (born 1942)
 Lloyd Best (1946–2016)
 Neil Bissoondath (born 1955)
 Dionne Brand (born 1953)
 Wayne Brown (born 1944)
 Cheryl Byron (1946–2016)

C
 Vahni Capildeo (born 1973)
 Michèle Pearson Clarke (born 1973)
 Nicole Craig (born 1974)
 Selwyn Cudjoe (born 1943)

D
 Ralph de Boissière (1946–2016)

E
 Ramabai Espinet (born 1948)

G
 Albert Gomes (1911–1978)
 Beatrice Greig (1869–)
 Rosa Guy (1922–2012)

H
 Errol Hill (1921–2003
 Merle Hodge (born 1944)
 Kevin Jared Hosein (born 1986)

J
 C. L. R. James (1901–1989)
 Barbara Jenkins
 Errol John (1901–1989)
 Amryl Johnson (1944–2001)
 Marion Patrick Jones (1931–2016)
 Anthony Joseph (born 1966)
 Edward Lanzer Joseph (1792 or 1793–1838

K
 Roi Kwabena (1956–2008)

L
 Harold Sonny Ladoo  (1945–1973)
 John La Rose (1927–2006) 
 Earl Lovelace (born 1935)
 John Lyons (born 1933)

M
 Ian McDonald (born 1933)
 Dionyse McTair (born 1950)
 Rabindranath Maharaj (born 1955)
 Ralph Maraj (born 1949)
 Tony Martin (1942–2013
 Mustapha Matura (born 1939)
 Marina Ama Omowale Maxwell
 Olga Maynard (1913–1994)
 Alfred Mendes (1897–1991)
 Shani Mootoo (born 1957)

N
 Seepersad Naipaul (1906–1953) 
 Shiva Naipaul (1945–1985)
 V. S. Naipaul (1932–2018)
 Elizabeth Nunez

P
 George Padmore (1903–1959)
 Leslie "Teacher" Palmer (born 1943)
 Kenneth Vidia Parmasad (1946–2006)
 Raoul Pantin (1943–2015)
 Lakshmi Persaud
 Michel Maxwell Philip (1829–1888)
 M. NourbeSe Philip (born 1947)

R
 Jennifer Rahim (born 1963)
 Kenneth Ramchand (born 1939)
 Raymond Ramcharitar
 Kevin Ramnarine
 Kris Rampersad
 Lennox Raphael (born 1939)
 E. M. Roach (1922–2012)
 Ronald Suresh Roberts (born 1968)
 Roger Robinson
 Monique Roffey (born 1965)

S
 Marina Salandy-Brown
 Sam Selvon (1923–1994)
 Raffique Shah (born 1946)
 Frances-Anne Solomon (born 1966)
 Eintou Pearl Springer (born 1944)

T
 Jeremy Taylor
 John Jacob Thomas (1841–1889)

W
 Derek Walcott (1930–2017)
 A. R. F. Webber (1911–1981) 
 Eric Williams (1911–1981)
 Henry Sylvester Williams (1869–1911)

See also
 Trinidad and Tobago literature

References

External links
 "Writers", The Best of Trinidad and Tobago.

Trinidad and Tobago writers
Trinidad and Tobago